DUG may refer to:
 Double-stranded uracil-DNA glycosylase, an enzyme
 Bisbee-Douglas International Airport, Arizona
 Developing Unconventional Gas, a series of energy conferences held annually.

See also
Dug (disambiguation)